Lake Xau is a lake that is sometimes a dry lakebed in Botswana. It is fed by the Boteti River and the Okavango Delta. The lake has been described as "when it holds water, ... one of the most important wetlands for waterfowl in Southern Africa".

References

Xau
Xau